A truth commission, or truth and reconciliation commission, is tasked with discovering and revealing past wrongdoing by a government.

Truth commission may also refer to:

Historical Truth Commission, the Presidential Commission of the Russian Federation to Counter Attempts to Falsify History to the Detriment of Russia's Interests (2009–2012)
The Truth Commission, a professional wrestling stable
Truth Commission (Chad), a 1990–1992 investigation of abuses during the tenure of former President Hissène Habré

See also
 Truth and Reconciliation Commission (disambiguation), bodies around the world using this name 
 Truth-seeking, the general process of societies examining past crimes in order to prevent their repetition in the future
 List of truth and reconciliation commissions